Linum perenne, the perennial flax, blue flax or lint, is a flowering plant in the family Linaceae, native to Europe, primarily in the Alps and locally in England. It has been introduced into North America, where it can be found on mountain ridges, wooded areas, and in sandy plain habitats of the sagebrush steppe, growing near sagebrush and rabbitbrush (Chrysothamnus).

The flowers are blue,  in diameter, and have five petals. The flowers will fall off if the stems are broken.

The English populations are sometimes distinguished as Linum perenne subsp. anglicum and high altitude populations in the Alps as Linum perenne subsp. alpinum. The similar western North American species Linum lewisii is sometimes treated as a subspecies of L. perenne.

Native Americans used the stems to make fishing line and nets.

Cultivation
Cultivars for garden use include 'Blue Sapphire'.

References

Further reading 
 Blamey, M. & Grey-Wilson, C. (1989). Illustrated Flora of Britain and Northern Europe. Hodder & Stoughton.
 Huxley, A. (1992). New RHS Dictionary of Gardening vol. 3: 93. Macmillan.
 
 

perenne
Flora of Europe
Flora of the Alps
Garden plants of Europe
Plants described in 1753
Taxa named by Carl Linnaeus